Akhil (in Devanagari: अखिल ) is a Hindu/Sanskrit Indian given name, which means "everything" or "complete".

The equivalent feminine name is Akhilā.

See also
Akhil (disambiguation)

References 

Indian masculine given names
Sanskrit-language names